Nanyuan Area was a township and area situated on the eastern side of Fengtai District, Beijing, China. It bordered Dongcheng  and Xicheng Districts to the north, Chaoyang District to the east, Daxing District to the south, Huaxiang Township and Lugouqiao Subdistrict to the west. As of the 2020 Chinese census, Nanyuan Area was home to 59,408 residents.

On July 11, 2021, the government of Fengtai District announced a series of changes to its subdivisions, which included the area's dissolution. This area is currently a part of Nanyuan Subdistrict.

History

Administrative Division 
In 2020, Nanyuan Subdistrict is divided into 19 subdivisions, with 7 communities and 12 villages:

References 

Fengtai District
Areas of Beijing